Kosmos 2368 ( meaning Cosmos 2368) was a Russian US-K missile early warning satellite which was launched in 1999 as part of the Russian Space Forces' Oko programme. The satellite was designed to identify missile launches using optical telescopes and infrared sensors.

Kosmos 2368 was launched from Site 16/2 at Plesetsk Cosmodrome in Russia. A Molniya-M carrier rocket with a 2BL upper stage was used to perform the launch, which took place at 19:12 UTC on 27 December 1999. The launch successfully placed the satellite into a molniya orbit. It subsequently received its Kosmos designation, and the international designator 1999-073A. The United States Space Command assigned it the Satellite Catalog Number 26042. The satellite (along with Kosmos 2340, Kosmos 2351, and Kosmos 2342) were lost after a 2001 fire destroyed the ground control building located at the Serpukhov-15 military base resulting in the loss of orbital control.

References

See also

List of Kosmos satellites (2251–2500)
List of R-7 launches (1995–1999)
1999 in spaceflight
List of Oko satellites

Kosmos satellites
Spacecraft launched in 1999
Oko
Spacecraft launched by Molniya-M rockets